At the time of first contact between Europe and the Americas, the indigenous peoples of the Caribbean included the Taíno of the northern Lesser Antilles, most of the Greater Antilles and the Bahamas, the Kalinago of the Lesser Antilles, the Ciguayo and Macorix of parts of Hispaniola, and the Guanahatabey of western Cuba. The Kalinago have maintained an identity as an indigenous people, with a reserved territory in Dominica.

Introduction

Some scholars consider it important to distinguish the Taíno from the neo-Taíno nations of Cuba, Puerto Rico, and Hispaniola, and the Lucayan of the Bahamas and Jamaica.  Linguistically or culturally these differences extended from various cognates or types of canoe: canoa, piragua, cayuco to distinct languages.  Languages diverged even over short distances. Previously these groups often had distinctly non-Taíno deities such as the goddess Jagua, strangely enough the god Teju Jagua is a major demon of indigenous Paraguayan mythology.  Still these groups plus the high Taíno are considered Island Arawak, part of a widely diffused assimilating culture, a circumstance witnessed even today by names of places in the New World; for example localities or rivers called Guamá are found in Cuba, Venezuela and Brazil. Guamá was the name of famous Taíno who fought the Spanish.

Thus, since the neo-Taíno had far more diverse cultural input and a greater societal and ethnic heterogeneity than the true high Taíno (Rouse, 1992) of Boriquen (Puerto Rico) a separate section is presented here.  A broader language group is Arawakan languages. The term Arawak (Aruaco) is said to be derived from an insulting term meaning "eaters of meal" given to them by mainland Caribs.  In turn the Arawak legend explains the origin of the Caribs as offspring of a putrid serpent.

The social classes of the neo-Taíno, generalized from Bartolomé de las Casas, appeared to have been loosely feudal with the following Taíno classes: naboría (common people), nitaíno' (sub-chiefs, or nobles), bohique, (shamans priests/healers), and the cacique (chieftains, or princes).  However, the neo-Taíno seem to have been more relaxed in this respect.

Administrative and/or national units
The Spanish found that most Cuban peoples for the part living peacefully in tidy towns and villages grouped into numerous principalities called cacicazgos or principalities with an almost feudal social structure. They were ruled by leaders or princes, called Caciques. Cuba was then divided into Guanahatabey, Ciboney, and Classical Taíno. Then some of Western Cuba was Guanahatabey. and some Ciboney. Taíno-like cultures controlled most of Cuba dividing it into the cacicazgos. Granberry and Vescelius (2004) and other contemporary authors only consider the cazicazgo of Baracoa as classical or high Taíno. Cuban cacicazgos including Bayaquitiri, Macaca, Bayamo, Camagüey, Jagua, Habana y Haniguanica are treated here as "neo-Taíno". Hispaniolan principalities at about 1500 included Maguá (Cacique Guarionex); Xaraguá (Behecchio); Maguana (Caonabo); Higüey also called Iguayagua (Higüayo); Cigüayo (Mayobanex), and unnamed region under Cacique Guanacagarí (Wilson, 1990). These principalities are considered to have various affinities to the contemporary Taíno and neo-Taíno cultures from what is now known as Puerto Rico and the Dominican Republic and Haiti, but are generally believed somewhat different.

Farming and fishing
The adroit farming and fishing skills of the neo-Taíno nations should not be underestimated; the names of fauna and flora that survive today are testimony of their continued use.  Neo-Taíno fishing technologies were most inventive, including harpoons and fishnets and traps. Neo-Taíno common names of fish are still used today (DeSola, 1932 ; Erdman, 1983; Florida Fish and Wild Life Commission (Division of Marine Fisheries) 2002; Puerto Rico, Commonwealth, 1998). Agriculture included a wide variety of germplasm, including maize, peanuts, tomato, squash, and beans plus a vast array of tree fruits. Tubers in most frequent use were yuca (Manihot esculenta) a crop with perhaps 10,000 years of development in the Americas; boniato (the "sweet potato" — Ipomoea batatas), and malanga (Xanthosoma sp.)

Taíno pharmacopoeia
As with all Arawak (Schultes, Raffault. 1990) and similar cultures there was considerable use of natural pharmacopoeia (Robineau, 1991).

Taíno studies
Taíno studies are in a state of both vigorous revival and conflict (Haslip-Viera, 2001).  In this conflict deeply embedded cultural mores, senses of nationality and ethnicity struggle with each other.  The Syboneistas undertook studies and wrote of neo-Taínos as part and cover for independence struggles against Spain (Fajardo, 1829 - circa 1862; Gautier Benítez, 1873).

Neo-Taíno and Taíno art
Taíno and related art has been celebrated in several significant exhibitions (Alegria, and Arrom 1998; Bercht, et al. 1997; Bullen, Dacal et al.; Kerchache, 1994, most notably in Paris.

Neo-Taíno music (areíto) survives as echoes in the rich traditions of the popular music of the Caribbean, but is believed to continue to exist in its purest form and associated spirituality among the Waroa of Venezuela.

Metallurgy
The art of the neo-Taínos demonstrates that these nations had metallurgical skills, and it has been postulated by some e.g. Paul Sidney Martin, that the inhabitants of these islands mined and exported metals such as copper (Martin et al. 1947). The Cuban town of (San Ramón de) Guaninao means the place of copper and is surmised to have been a site of pre-Columbian mining.

Peoples of the Caribbean

Archaic Age people

DNA studies changed some of the traditional beliefs about pre-Columbian indigenous history. According to National Geographic, "studies confirm that a wave of pottery-making farmers—known as Ceramic Age people—set out in canoes from the northeastern coast of South America starting some 2,500 years ago and island-hopped across the Caribbean. They were not, however, the first colonizers. On many islands they encountered a foraging people who arrived some 6,000 or 7,000 years ago...The ceramicists, who are related to today’s Arawak-speaking peoples, supplanted the earlier foraging inhabitants—presumably through disease or violence—as they settled new islands."

Taíno

The Taíno, an Arawak people, were the major population group throughout most of the Caribbean. Their culture was divided into three main groups, the Western Taíno, the Classic Taíno, and the Eastern Taíno, with other variations within the islands.

Classic Taíno
The Classic Taíno lived in eastern Cuba, Hispaniola, and Puerto Rico. They spoke a dialect called Classic Taíno. Compared to their neighbors, the Classic Taíno had substantially developed agricultural societies. Puerto Rico was divided into twenty chiefdoms which were organized into one united kingdom or confederation, Borinquen. Hispaniola was divided into roughly 45 chiefdoms, which were organized into five kingdoms under the leadership of the chief of each area's premier chiefdom. Beginning around 1450, Classic Taíno from Hispaniola began migrating to eastern Cuba; they are conventionally known as the Cuban Taíno. The Cuban Taíno gained power over some of Cuba's earlier Western Taíno inhabitants, the Ciboney, but no regional or island-wide political structure had developed on the island at the time of Spanish colonization of the Americas.

Eastern Taíno
The Eastern Taíno inhabited the Leeward Islands of the Lesser Antilles, from the Virgin Islands to Montserrat. They had less sophisticated societies than the Classic Taíno.

Western Taíno

The Western Taíno lived in the Bahamas, central Cuba, westernmost Hispaniola, and Jamaica. They spoke a dialect known as Ciboney Taíno or Western Taíno. The Western Taíno of the Bahamas were known as the Lucayans, they were wiped out by Spanish slave raids by 1520. Western Taíno living in Cuba were known as the Ciboney. They had no chiefdoms or organized political structure beyond individual villages, but by the time of Spanish conquest many were under the control of the Cuban Taíno in eastern Cuba.

Igneri

According to oral history, the Igneri were the original Arawak inhabitants of the Windward Islands in the Lesser Antilles before being conquered by the Caribs who are thought to have arrived from South America. Contemporary sources like to suggest that the Caribs took Igneri women as their wives while killing the men, resulting in the two sexes speaking different languages. This is not proven, and there appears to be a confusion of the reality: despite the name, the Island Carib language was Arawakan, not Cariban. Irving Rouse suggests that small numbers of Caribs may have conquered the Igneri without displacing them, and could have gradually adopted their language while retaining the Carib identity, but there is no evidence to prove this. Though they were Arawaks, the Igneri language appears to be as distinct from the Taíno language as it was from the mainland Arawak language of South America.

Kalinago

By the contact period, the Kalinago, also known as Island Caribs, inhabited the Windward Islands of the Lesser Antilles. "Caribbean" derives from the name "Carib", by which the Kalinago were formerly known. They self-identified with the Kalina or mainland Carib people of South America. Contemporary accounts asserted that the Island Caribs had conquered the Windward Islands from their previous inhabitants, the Igneri. However, the Kalinago language was Arawakan, not Cariban. Irving Rouse suggests that small numbers of South American Caribs invaded the Windwards and conquered the Igneri without displacing them; they gradually adopted the local language while maintaining the Carib identity. The Kalinago outlasted their Taíno neighbors, and continue to live in the Lesser Antilles in the Caribbean. Noteworthy Kalinago descendants live on within the Garifuna people, known as the Black Caribs who descend from St. Vincent in the Lesser Antilles.

Guanahatabey

A separate ethnic identity from far western Cuba. They were an archaic hunter-gatherer people who spoke a language distinct from Taíno, and appear to have predated the agricultural, Taíno-speaking Ciboney.

Ciguayo

A separate ethnic people that inhabited the Peninsula of Samaná and part of the northern coast toward Nagua in what today is the Dominican Republic, and, by most contemporary accounts, differed in language and customs from the classical or high Taíno who lived on the eastern part of the island of Hispaniola then known.  According to Eustaquio Fernandez de Navarrete, they were “warriors and spirited people,” (“gente animosa y guerrera”). The Cronista de Indias, Pedro Martir accused them of cannibalism: “when they descend from the mountains to wage war on their neighbors, they kill and eat some of them” (“trae[n] origen de los caníbales, pues cuando de las montañas bajan a lo llano para hacer guerra á sus vecinos, si matan á algunos se los comen”). Fray Ramón Pané, often dubbed as the first anthropologist of the Caribbean, distinguished the Ciguayo language from the rest of those spoken on Hispaniola. Bartolomé de las Casas, who studied them and was one of the few who read Ramón Pané’s original work in Spanish, provided most of the documentation about this group. Linguists Granberry and Gary Vescelius believe that the Cigüayos emigrated from Central America. Wilson (1990) states that circa 1500 this was the kingdom Cacicazgo of Cacique Guacangarí.

Macorix

Another separate ethnic group that lived on the eastern side of the island of Hispaniola. Their region today is in the Dominican Republic.  According to las Casas, their language was unintelligible for the Taínos, but may have been similar to the Ciguayo language.(Wilson, 1990)

Recent studies show that the Macorix people coexisted with the Tainos on Hispaniola. The names San Francisco de Macorix and San Pedro de Macorix in the Dominican Republic are indirect references to the political divisions of the cacicazgo. The Spaniards wrongly assumed that the names given to the different territories were a reference "to what they called a Cacicazgo:

Florida tribes

The Tequesta of the southeast coast of the Florida peninsula were once considered to be related to the Taíno, but most anthropologists now doubt this. The Tequesta had been present in the area for at least 2,000 years at the time of first European contact, and are believed to have built the Miami Stone Circle. Carl O. Sauer called the Florida Straits "one of the most strongly marked cultural boundaries in the New World", noting that the Straits were also a boundary between agricultural systems, with Florida Indians growing seed crops that originated in Mexico, while the Lucayans of the Bahamas grew root crops that originated in South America.

It is possible that a few Lucayas reached Florida shortly before the first European contacts in the area, but the northwestern Bahamas had remained uninhabited until approximately 1200, and the long established presence of the existing tribes in Florida would have likely prevented any pioneering settlements by people who had only just reached the neighboring islands. Analysis of ocean currents and weather patterns indicates that people traveling by canoe from the Bahamas to Florida were likely to land in northern Florida rather than closer to the Bahamas. A single 'Antillean axe head' found near Gainesville, Florida may support some limited contacts. Due to the same ocean currents, direct travel in canoes from southern Florida to the Bahamas was unlikely.

The term and context of the Ciboney (Siboney)
Ciboney (also Siboney) is a term preferred in Cuban historic contexts for the neo-Taíno nations of Cuba.

Our knowledge of the Cuban indigenous cultures which are often, but less precisely, lumped into a category called Taíno (Caribbean Island Arawak) comes from early Spanish sources, oral traditions and considerable archeological evidence. The Spanish found that most Cuban peoples were, for the most part, living peacefully in tidy towns and villages grouped into numerous principalities called Cacicazgos with an almost feudal social structure (see Bartolomé de las Casas). They were ruled by leaders called Caciques. Cuba was divided into Guanahatabey, Ciboney-Taíno (here neo-Taíno), and Classical (High) Taíno. Some of western Cuba was Guanahatabey and some Siboney (see below).

Taíno-like cultures controlled most of Cuba, dividing it into cacicazgos or principalities. Granberry, Vescelius (2004), and other contemporary authors only consider the cacicazgo of Baracoa as Classical or High Taíno. Cuban cacicazgos including Bayaquitiri, Macaca, Bayamo, Camagüey, Jagua, Habana y Haniguanica are considered neo-Taíno. These principalities are considered to have various affinities to contemporary Taíno and neo-Taíno cultures from Puerto Rico and Hispaniola, but are generally believed to have been somewhat different.

Ethnic/cultural derivatives

Guajiros and Jibaros
The common name given to the rural inhabitants of Cuba is guajiros. Del Campo implies that quajiros are "native-born whites" and states that in Puerto Rico "the influence of the indigenous population is more marked than that of the native populations in Cuba".

In Puerto Rico, the rural inhabitants are called Jibaros. The term jíbaro, according to the Catholic online encyclopedia, is also the name of a tribal group in South America, it meant "mountain men."  Jíbaro means "People of the Forest" in the Taíno language. So the term obviously came with them as they immigrated from South America. However "jíbaro" – as is used in Puerto Rico, is not used the same in Cuba or the Dominican Republic, which were populated with the very same Taíno people.
In Cuba the word jibaro is used to denote something wild or untamed, such as "perros jibaros " or wild dogs.

Guajiro nation
The term Guajira/Guajiro, also refers to indigenous Arawak nation of the Guajira Peninsula between Venezuela and Colombia.  For a small compendium of myths of this Nation please see:
de Cora, Maria Manuela 1972. Kuai-Mare. Mitos Aborígenes de Venezuela. Monte Avila Editores Caracas.

Later nations in this general area
The Arawak, Carib, other Mesoamerican coast, and Amazonian cultures can be considered as part of a tenuous continuum of nations, linked by some shared vocabulary, ethnic links, agricultural practices, reinforced by bride abduction, and continuous exogamy. After the violence of the Spanish conquest, and subsequent events of African slavery and rebellion, nations and cultures with diverse amounts of Arawak ethnicity, culture, and/or traditions transmuted and arose. Some of these nations had mixed or even predominantly African roots, which include the Cimarrón of Cuba and the Maroons of Jamaica and Guyana.

See also
Indigenous peoples of the Americas
Arawak
Arawakan languages
Cariban languages
Languages of the Caribbean
Pre-Arawakan languages of the Greater Antilles
Garifuna
Genetic history of indigenous peoples of the Americas
Igneri
Indigenous peoples of Florida
Indigenous peoples in Venezuela
Island Caribs
List of Spanish words of Indigenous American Indian origin
Influx of disease in the Caribbean

Notes

References

Albury, Paul 1975 The Story of the Bahamas. MacMillan Education Limited, London and Basingstoke.  p. 19 "After the first screams of despair, terror took such sole possession of the Lucayan's mind and body that it robbed him of the ability to defend himself. He became a jellied mass of sweating, trembling, helpless flesh. Men, women, and children were bound with ropes, stacked in the cane and taken to Carib land. There the males were mutilated, tortured and finally eaten.  The females were kept for breeding purposes. And, it is said, their male offspring, sired by Caribs, were also eaten."
Alonso José Ramón 2004 (accessed 11/7/2005).  Panorama histórico-crítico sobre el estudio del arte rupestre de Punta del Este, Cuba.  http://rupestreweb.tripod.com/puntadeleste.html
Alvarez Chanca, Diego. La Carta del Doctor Chanca, que escribió à la Ciudad de Sevilla. Collección de los viages y descubrimientos. Martin Fernández de Navarrete. Madrid, 1825 Atl atl? "Los desta isla pelean con unas varas agudas, las cuales tiran con unas tiranderas como las que tiran los mochachos las varillas en Castilla, con las cuales tiran muy lejos asaz certero. "
Álvarez Conde, José 1956.  Arqueología Indocubana.  Junta Nacional de Arqueología y Etnología Impresores Úcar, García, S. A. Havana.
Álvarez Nazario, Manuel 1996. Arqueología Lingüística. Estudios modernos dirigidos al rescate y reconstrucción del arahuaco taíno. Editorial de la Universidad de Puerto Rico, San Juan, Puerto Rico.
Arciniegas, Germán (editor) 1999. Historiadores de las Indias. Consejo Nacional para la Cultura y las Artes.  Editorial Océano de México S.A.
Arrom, Jose Juan 2000 Estudios de Lexicologia Antillana. Editorial de la Universidad de Puerto Rico.  San Juan, Puerto Rico
Azcárate Rosell, Rafael 1937.  Historia de los Indios de Cuba. Editorial Tropical, Havana.

Barreiro, José 1990 A Note on Taínos: Whither Progress? Northeast Indian Quarterly Fall, 1990, pp. 66–77. http://www.hartford-hwp.com/archives/41/013.html https://web.archive.org/web/20051125070332/http://www.uctp.org/ANoteonTainos.html
Barreiro, José 2005 In Cuba the cry was for water. Indian Country Today part one October 13, part two October 20, 2005.  (accessed October 25, 2005) https://web.archive.org/web/20071010125128/http://www.indiancountry.com/content.cfm?id=1096411742 https://web.archive.org/web/20060114074516/http://www.indiancountry.com/content.cfm?id=1096411782
Beltran, Juan. 1924. "Bojeo de Cuba por Sebastian de O’Campo" El Universal, Havana p. 9 paragraph 3 "Vista de los Azules y aun tal vez vagamente presentada al misterioso reflejo de los lambentes, que andando los días había de servir de base a la poética y sentimental Luz de Yara..."
Bercht, Fatima Estrellita Brodsky, John Alan Farmer, Dicey Taylor, (eds) 1997. Taíno: Pre-Columbian Art and Culture from the Caribbean. Museo Del Barrio Monacelli Press, New York.
Biarakú (a Taíno Cultural Interest Group) 1999. 2. Taíno Sun Symbols Taíno Forum #25 http://members.aol.com/STaino/forum_25.htm, rixturey@netscape.net rixturey@netscape.net
Biarakú (a Taíno Cultural Interest Group) 2003 Taíno Short Dictionary
Black, Clinton V. 1965. History of Jamaica.  3rd edition Collins Clear Type Press, London and Glasgow.
Breton, Raymond 1665. Dictionnaire caraïbe–français (El caribe insular del siglo XVII Tratado sobre la lengua y la cultura de los Callínago) Translated to Spanish by Duna Troiani CELIA-CNRS / París (Centro de estudios de las lenguas indígenas de América, Centre national de la recherche scientifique.) Link found at https://web.archive.org/web/20050414091620/http://www.centrelink.org/General.html
Bueno, Salvador (ed.) 2003. Cuban Leyends (SeigfriedKaden illustrator, Christine R. Ayorinde translator).  Markus Weiner Publishers, Princeton, New Jersey, USA.
Carrada, Alfred 2003 (Accessed 11/5/2005) Dictionary of the Taíno language
De las Casas, Bartolomé (circa 1474–1566, 1995 reprinting). Historia de las Indias, Cultura Economica, Mexico City (Casas vol. 2, p. 521-522).
Castellanos Garcia, Gerardo 1927. Tierras y Glorias de Oriente (Calixto Garcia Iñiguez), Editorial Hermes Havana p. 155.
Castellanos, Juan de.  1874 Elegia VI. Elegías de varones ilustres de Indias. Madrid: M. Rivadeneyra, pp. 14–17.
Cienfuegos page (sampled September 9, 2004) Leyendas de Cienfuegos,  Las Mulatas. http://www.cienfuegoscuba.galeon.com/lasmulatas.htm
Cohen, J. M (editor and translator) 1969. The Four Voyages of Christopher Columbus. Being His Own Log-Book, Letters and Dispatches. Penguin Books, London, New York and Victoria Australia.
 "He therefore went to the island of Guadalupe, anchored there and sent boats ashore well armed. But, before they arrived, a number of women came out of the woods carrying bows and arrows, and with feathers on their heads, apparently resolved to defend the island … to northern islands … When the ships came very close to shore, they saw many Indian men coming out on to the beach with bows and arrows, which they shot at our men with great daring and great shouts. But they shot in vain, for their arrows fell short … The houses were square not round like on the islands, and in one of them a human arm was found cooking in a stew pot." (pp. 195–196)
Coll y Toste, Cayetano 1972. "Vocabulario indo-antillano." In: Clásicos de Puerto Rico second edition, Ediciones Latinoamericanas. Found at: http://www.angelfire.com/de2/bohemia/diccionario.html  https://web.archive.org/web/20080430163856/http://members.dandy.net/~orocobix/terms1.htm
De Cora, Maria Manuela 1972. Kuai-Mare. Mitos Aborígenes de Venezuela. Monte Avila Editores Caracas.
Crespo, George 1993.  How the Sea Began. A Taíno Myth Retold and Illustrated. Clarion Books, New York.

Dacal Moure, Ramon, Manuel Rivero De La Calle, Daniel H. Sandweiss 1996 Art and Archaeology of Pre-Columbian Cuba (Pitt Latin American Series) University of Pittsburgh Press, Pittsburg.

Drummond, Lee. 1981 "The serpent's children: semiotics of cultural genesis in Arawak and Trobriand myth." – American ethnologist (Washington) 8 (3): 633-660. "Drummond tells us in his study of Arawak myth (1981), the action of celebrating the myth of Arawak origins actually creates the distinction between the Arawak and the Carib. It renders the Arawak people real." https://web.archive.org/web/20051102230133/http://www.uwm.edu/~wash/mirror13.htm
Erdman, D.S. 1983. "Nombres vulgares de peces de Puerto Rico. Common names of fishes in Puerto Rico CODREMAR". Inf. Téc. 3(2): 1-44 (not yet obtained).
Estefanía, Carlos Manuel 2005 Así nació Cuba In: Cuba Nuestra digital (accessed 11/5/2005) https://web.archive.org/web/20050507075517/http://www.cubanuestra.nu/web/article.asp?artID=2330
D’ Estéfano Pisani, Miguel A. 1943. La Delincuencia de los Indios de Cuba. Jesus Montero (Editor), Havana. (Note: this book shows a strong biased against the Taínos, and yet it provides useful insights into Taíno word usage)
Fajardo, Juan Cristobal Nápoles (known as Cucalambé 1829–1862?). Cucalambé (Décimas Cubanas. Selección de Rumores del Hórmigo) Ediciones Universal Miami 2nd Edition 1999.
Fernández de Oviedo, Gonzalo (República Dominicana, Puerto Rico, Cuba, 1478–1557). Libro doceno. Primera Parte. Historia General y Natural de las Indias. Volume 2. Primera Parte. Historia General y Natural de las Indias.
Fergus, Claudius 2003. The 'Carib' Work Stones of Chateaubelair: curio or calendar system? St Vincent and the Grenadines Country Conference Pre-Prints University of the West Indies. St Vincent and the Grenadines. http://www.uwichill.edu.bb/bnccde/svg/conference/papers/fergus.html
Figueroa, Ivonne 2004 Taínos El Boricua. Edited by Barbara Yañez, Assistant WebSite Editor http://www.elboricua.com/history.html accessed 2/15/04
Florida Fish and Wildlife Conservation Commission (Division of Marine Fisheries) 2002 Land Crabs (Cardisoma guanhumi). September 2002 http://www.floridaconservation.org/commission/2002/sept/LANDCRABS.pdf
Gautier Benítez, José. "Romance". El Progreso (periodical), 24 August 1873. p. 3.
Gomez de la Maza y Jimenez, Manuel and Juan Tomas Roig y Mesa 1914. Flora de Cuba (Datos para su estudio)  Rambla, Bouza y Cia, Havana.
Bobby Gonzalez. Taino Indian reading list
Gonzalez, Francisco J. 1996 Taíno-Maya Contacts. Taíno-L Taíno Forum The retrospective history of the Native Caribbean World History Archives Hartford Web Publishing http://www.hartford-hwp.com/archives/41/238.html
Grondine, E.P. (accessed 11/5/2005) Going into the water: A survey of impact events and the coastal peoples of south-east North America, the Caribbean, and Central America http://abob.libs.uga.edu/bobk/ccc/ce010702.html
Torres, Pedro. circa 1999. Taíno Words. The Taíno Tribal Council http://www.hartford-hwp.com/Taino/jatibonuco.html
Guitar, Lynne (2002). Documentando el mito de la extinción de la cultura Taína. KACIKE: Revista de la historia y antropología de los indígenas del Caribe [Revista electrónica], special edition, Lynne Guitar, editor. Disponible en: https://web.archive.org/web/20051026125615/http://www.kacike.org/GuitarEspanol.html [Accessed 05/11/2005]
Granberry, Julian, and Gary Vescelius 2004 Languages of the Pre-Columbian Antilles, University Alabama Press, Tuscaloosa, 
Gulf States Maine Fisheries Commission 2003 Cairina moschata Linnaeus,
Haslip-Viera, Gabriel (Editor) 2001 Taíno Revival: Critical Perspectives on Puerto Rican Identity and Cultural Politics. Markus Wiener Publishers, Princeton N.J. 
Herbold, Stacey. Jamaican Patois and the Power of Language in Reggae Music The only evidence of the Arawak dialect in Jamaica today is a few loan words, place names, food, natural objects, and events (hurricane) (Lalla and D’Costa, 1990). Xaymaca is actually an Arawak word meaning "island of springs", which is where the name Jamaica is derived from (Pryce, 1997). It is possible that the first contact of the Arawaks and the Spaniards may have led to an early pidgin or bilingualism among the first generation of mixed blood."
Hernández Aquino, Luis. 1993. Diccionario de voces indígenas de Puerto Rico. Tercera edición, Editorial Cultural, Esmaco, Hato Rey, Puerto Rico.
Hill, Jonathan D. and Fernando Santos-Granero (eds.). 2002. Comparative Arawakan Histories. Rethinking Language Family and Cultural Area in Amazonia. University of Illinois Press, Urbana and Chicago. 
Jiménez, Mariano II and Mariano G. Jiménez 2003 El Güije. Cuentos de Antaño http://www.guije.com/index.htm
Johnson, Kim (accessed 5/3/2005) The story of the 'Caribs and Arawaks'  http://www.raceandhistory.com/Taino/Caribs.htm
López de Gómara, Francisco. Primera Parte. La historia general de las Indias. Historiadores primitivos de Indias. Enrique de Vedia, ed. Madrid: Imprenta de M. Ribadeneyra, 1877.
Maciques Sánchez, Esteban 2004. El arte rupestre del Caribe insular: estilo y cronología in Rupestreweb, http://rupestreweb.tripod.com/maciques.html
Martinez Arango, Felipe, 1997. "Los Aborigines de la Cuenca de Santiago de Cuba." Ediciones Universal, Miami.

Mendez, Eugenio Fernandez 1981. Cronicas de Puerto Rico, Desde la Conquista Hasta Nuestros Dias (1493–1955) Editorial Universitaria, Universidad de Puerto Rico, Rio Piedras.
Miner Solá, Edwin 2002 Diccionario Taíno Ilustrado. Ediciones Servilibros (Serie Puerto Rico Prehistórico, 1). San Juan, Indigenous language dictionary arranged thematically with numerous illustrations, many in color.
Nápoles Fajardo, Juan Cristobal (known as Cucalambé 1829–1862?). Cucalambé (Décimas Cubanas. Selección de Rumores del Hórmigo) Ediciones Universal Miami 2nd Edition1999.
Nicholson, Desmond V. 1983. The Story of the Arawaks in Antigua and Bermuda. Antigua Archeological Society.  Antigua West Indies.
Olsen, Fred 1974. On the Trail of the Arawaks.  Civilization of the American Indian, v 129.  University of Oklahoma Press. Norman. Oklahoma.
Pané, Fray Ramón (circa 1475-circa 1498) An Account of the Antiquities of the Indians: Chronicles of the New World Encounter (Latin America in Translation/En Traduccion/En Traducao) Jose Juan Arom (Editor), Susan C. Griswold (translator). Duke University Press, Durham and London.  (1999 edition).
Pané, Fray Ramón. Relación de Fray Ramon de las antigüedades de los indios. Cuba primitiva. Habana: Miguel de Villa, 1883.
Papá Lino 2002 "¡Qué Te Parece, Boricua"  Publicaciones Puertorriqueñas, 2nd ed. "El dios taíno Yuquiyú es el mismo 'Loukuo' de la mitología escandinava." Cited from https://web.archive.org/web/20071112091459/http://groups.msn.com/CarlitosWay/triviadeborinquen.msnw
Puerto Rico, Commonwealth. 1998 Reglamento de Pesca de Puerto Rico Departamento de Recursos Naturales y Ambientales. Salvador Salas Quintana (Secretario). https://web.archive.org/web/20060227201150/http://www.drna.gobierno.pr/reglamentospdf/DRNA/Reglamento%20de%20Pesca.pdf
Rivas, Anthony T. 2000 Enigmas of Cuban Spanish Proteus, Newsletter of the National Association of Judiciary Interpreters and Translators Vol. IX, No. 3 Summer 2000 https://web.archive.org/web/20051124160310/http://www.najit.org/proteus/v9n3/rivas_v9n3.htm "While lacking conclusive proof, some linguists believe that the marked intonation pattern exhibited by some natives of the former Oriente province originates in Arawak, a language spoken by the indigenous Taíno people, who survived for a limited time just in this province."
Robineau, Lionel (editor) 1991. Towards a Caribbean Pharmacopoeia. End-Caribe, Santo Domingo, Dominican Republic.
Robiou La Marche, Sebastián 2003. Taínos and Caribes. Las culturas aborígenes antillanas. Editorial Punto y Coma, San Juan Puerto Rico.

Rouse, Irving 1992. The Taínos. Rise and Decline of the People Who Greeted Columbus. Yale University Press. New Haven and London.
Sauer, Carl Otwin. 1966. (Fourth printing, 1992.) The Early Spanish Main. The University of California Press. 
de la Sagra, Ramón 1843. Historia física, política y natural de la Isla de Cuba, Libreria de Arthus Bertrand, Paris.
Schwartz, Marion. 1997. A History of Dogs in the Early Americas. Yale University Press, New Haven pp. 76–78.
Sears, William H. 1977.  Seaborne contacts between early cultures in the lower southeastern United States and Middle (-) through South America. In: The Sea in the pre-Columbian World.  Elizabeth P. Benson, editor. Dumbarton Oaks Research Library and Collections, Trustees for Harvard University, Washington, D.C. pp. 1–15.
Suarez, Constantino 1921 Vocabulario Cubano, Libreria Cervantes, Havana and Perlado, Páez y Cía, Madrid.
Sued Badillo, Jalil. 1985. Las Cacicas Indoantillanas, Revista del Instituto de Cultura Puertorriqueña 87, 1-26.
UCTP (United Confederation of Taíno People) 2002. Diccionario de Voces Taína’ (Taíno Dictionary) https://web.archive.org/web/20071016055722/http://www.uctp.org/VocesIndigena.html 
Vazquez Doris M. 1993 (accessed 11/7/2005) Puerto Rican Folktales
http://www.yale.edu/ynhti/curriculum/units/1993/2/93.02.12.x.html#top
Vela, Enrique (editor). 1988. La navegación entre los Mayas. Arqueología Mexicana 6 (number 33, September October 1988) 4-5.
Vespucio, Américo (circa 1454–1512), Fragments and Letters found at https://web.archive.org/web/20051210061617/http://www.e-libro.net/E-libro-viejo/gratis/nvomundo.pdf https://web.archive.org/web/20051028185055/http://www.unsl.edu.ar/librosgratis/gratis/nvomundo.pdf 
https://web.archive.org/web/20040818183442/http://www.banrep.gov.co/blaavirtual/credencial/hamerica.htm translated '.. the women go naked and are libidinous, lewd, and lustful but despite this their bodies are beautiful and clean...."
Wilbert, Johannes1977. Navigators of the Winter Sun In: The Sea in the pre-Columbian World.  Elizabeth P. Benson, editor. Dumbarton Oaks Research Library and Collections, Trustees for Harvard University, Washington, D.C. pp. 16–44.
Wilson, Samuel M. 1990 Hispaniola Caribbean Chiefdoms in the Age of Columbus. University of Alabama Press, Tuscaloosa and London. 
Zayas y Alfonso, Alfredo 1914. "Lexografía Antillana" El Siglo XX Press, Havana.
Hill, Jonathan D. and Fernando Santos-Granero (eds.). 2002. Comparative Arawakan Histories. Rethinking Language Family and Cultural Area in Amazonia. University of Illinois Press, Urbana and Chicago. 
Hulme. Peter 2000 Remnants of Conquest. The Island Caribs and their Visitors, 1877–1898. Oxford University Press 
La Rosa Corzo, Gabino (translated by Mary Todd) [1988] 2003 Runaway Slave Settlements in Cuba: Resistance and Repression, University of North Carolina Press, Chapel Hill  
De la Riva Herrera, Martín 2003 La Conquista de los Motilones, Tabalosos, Maynas y Jíbaros. CETA Iquitos, Perú

External links